Devipada is a densely populated area in East Borivali, Mumbai, Maharashtra, India. Devipada includes Devipada SRA CHS (known as Titananic bld), Sadguru Nagar, Vitthal Nagar, Millennium Tower, Gulmohar and Sahyadri. Most residents are Marathi, with a number of Gujaratis and North Indians. Shree Gajanan Maharaj Mandir Bhakt Mandal is very famous & popular not only in Devipada but also in borivali. This area is politically very important for the politicians. about 40% of earlier devipada is undergone for construction of buildings till 20-04-2011, still work is in progress.

Buses
Following buses stop at the Devipada bus stop:
 Ordinary buses: 225  287  298
 Limited buses: 40ltd  348ltd  398ltd  400ltd  523ltd  524ltd  700ltd  701ltd  703ltd  704ltd  708ltd  709ltd

External links
 Devipada community on Orkut
 Buses through the Devipada Stop

Suburbs of Mumbai
Borivali